"Lust for Life" is a 1977 song performed by Iggy Pop and co-written by David Bowie, featured on the album of the same name.  In 2004, Rolling Stone ranked it No. 149 on their list of "The 500 Greatest Songs of All Time", re-ranking it No. 325 in their 2021 updated list.

Composition and performance
Co-written by Iggy Pop and David Bowie (written on a ukulele), the song is known for its opening drumbeat (played by Hunt Sales). The rhythm was based on the Armed Forces Network call signal, which Pop and Bowie picked up on while waiting for a broadcast of Starsky & Hutch. The drumbeat has since been imitated in numerous songs, including "Are You Gonna Be My Girl" by Jet and "Selfish Jean" by Travis; however, Sales's use of the rhythm was not original, as it was itself derived from "You Can't Hurry Love", released in July 1966 by The Supremes, and "I'm Ready for Love", released in October 1966 by Martha and the Vandellas.

In 1977, the song reached No. 3 in the Dutch Top 40 as well as in Yugoslavia. Its success was credited to a performance in the Dutch pop TV show TopPop, where Iggy Pop, shirtless, wrecked part of the stage set (which consisted of a couple of potted plants and some cardboard scenery). Although many viewers and newspapers complained about the apparent damage, the director of TopPop later admitted that they knew beforehand what Iggy was going to do and that the damage was minimal.

Lyrics
The song's lyrics contain a number of references to William S. Burroughs' experimental novel The Ticket That Exploded, most notably mentions of "Johnny Yen" (described by Burroughs as "The Boy-Girl Other Half strip tease God of sexual frustration") and "hypnotizing chickens".

In a 1995 interview, Doors keyboardist Ray Manzarek and manager Danny Sugerman stated that the opening lyrics were about their deceased heroin dealer, nicknamed "Gypsy Johnny", arriving at Wonderland Avenue, with his heroin and his "motorized dildos".

Track listing

1996 UK single
 "Lust for Life" – 5:11
 "(Get Up I Feel Like A) Sex Machine" – 4:05
 "Lust for Life (Live at the Feile Festival, 1993)" – 5:35
 "I Wanna Be Your Dog (Live at the Rock for Choice Benefit concert)" – 4:55

Personnel
According to biographer Chris O'Leary:
Iggy Pop – lead vocals
David Bowie – piano
Ricky Gardiner – lead guitar
Tony Sales – bass, backing vocals
Carlos Alomar – rhythm guitar
Hunt Sales – drums, tambourine, shaker, backing vocals

Trainspotting
"Lust for Life" gained renewed popularity in the late 1990s after being featured in the 1996 British film Trainspotting. The song was heavily featured in the film's marketing campaign and subsequent soundtrack album, resulting in a new UK chart peak of number 26 after being reissued as a single;  it also reached #39 on the US Radio & Records Alternative chart. The single's success inspired Pop's then-label Virgin Records to issue a greatest hits compilation titled Nude & Rude. Pop's biographer Joe Ambrose writes that the song gained the same level of resurgence as the Doors' "The End" after that song's inclusion in Francis Ford Coppola's 1979 film Apocalypse Now. In 1999, Pop reflected on the song's renewed popularity:

A remix by The Prodigy was featured in Trainspotting'''s 2017 sequel, T2 Trainspotting''.

Certifications

References

Sources
 

 

1977 songs
Iggy Pop songs
Tom Jones (singer) songs
Songs written by Iggy Pop
Songs written by David Bowie
Song recordings produced by David Bowie
American garage rock songs
Jangle pop songs